Tony Bhullar is a Canadian politician, who represented the electoral district of Surrey-Newton in the Legislative Assembly of British Columbia from 2001 to 2005. He sat as a member of the BC Liberal Party.

Electoral record

|-

|-

|NDP
|Param Grewal
|align="right"|3,949
|align="right"|28.93%
|align="right"|
|align="right"|$32,318

|- bgcolor="white"
!align="right" colspan=3|Total Valid Votes
!align="right"|13,649
!align="right"|100.00%
!align="right"|
!align="right"|
|- bgcolor="white"
!align="right" colspan=3|Total Rejected Ballots
!align="right"|92
!align="right"|0.67%
!align="right"|
!align="right"|
|- bgcolor="white"
!align="right" colspan=3|Turnout
!align="right"|13,741
!align="right"|65.51%
!align="right"|
!align="right"|
|}

References

British Columbia Liberal Party MLAs
Living people
People from Surrey, British Columbia
21st-century Canadian politicians
Independent MLAs in British Columbia
Canadian politicians of Indian descent
Year of birth missing (living people)